The U language or P'uman, is spoken by 40,000 people in the Yunnan Province of China and possibly Myanmar. It is classified as an Austroasiatic language in the Palaungic branch. In China, U speakers are classified as ethnic Bulang.

Locations

U is spoken in Shuangjiang County of Yunnan and other nearby counties.

Wang & Chen (1981) covers the dialect of Pengpan 碰拚, Dafengshan Township 大凤山乡, Shuangjiang County.
Zhou & Yan (1983) covers the dialect of Pangpin 胖品, Yongge Township 永革乡, Shuangjiang County.
Yan & Zhou (2012) cover U of Gantang 甘塘, Yongde County as well as U of Pangpin 胖品.
Svantesson (1991:67) documents the U dialect of Paɑ̃ Xɛp (Bangxie, 邦协), Shahe Township 沙河乡, Shuangjiang County.

There two main dialects of U in Shuangjiang County: one spoken in Gongnong (公弄, now part of Mengku Town, 勐库镇) and one spoken in Bangbing (邦丙) and Dawen Mangga (大文乡忙嘎); the Dawen dialect is reportedly mutually intelligible with that of Shidian County (Shuangjiang County Ethnic Gazetteer 1995:160).

Avala (autonym: a21 va21 la21) is spoken in Bangliu (邦六), Manghuai Township (芒怀乡), Yun County (云县), Yunnan, China.

Phonology
U has four tones, high, low, rising, falling, which developed from vowel length and the nature of final consonants.

References

Further reading

 
 
 
 
 

 

Gazetteers and other Chinese government sources with lexical data

Nanjian County Gazetteer Commission [南涧县志编纂委员会编] (ed). 1993. Nanjian County Gazetteer [南涧彝族自治县志]. Chengdu: Sichuan Reference Press [四川辞书出版社].
Na Ruzhen [納汝珍], et al. (eds). 1994. Zhenkang County Ethnic Gazetteer [镇康县民族志]. Kunming: Yunnan People's Press [云南民族出版社].
Simao Prefecture Ethnic Minority Affairs Bureau [思茅行暑民族事务委员会] (ed). 1990. A study of the Bulang people [布朗族研究]. m.s.
Xiao Dehua [萧德虎], et al. (eds). 1992. Zhenkang County Gazetteer [镇康县志]. 1992. Chengdu: Sichuan People's Press [四川民族出版社].
Yunnan Gazetteer Commission [云南省地方志编纂委员会] (ed). 1998. Yunnan Provincial Gazetteer, Vol. 59: Minority Languages Orthographies Gazetteer [云南省志. 卷五十九, 少数民族语言文字志]. Kunming: Yunnan People's Press [云南人民出版社].

External links 
 RWAAI | Projects RWAAI (Repository and Workspace for Austroasiatic Intangible Heritage)
 http://hdl.handle.net/10050/00-0000-0000-0003-67B4-3@view U in RWAAI Digital Archive

Palaungic languages
Definitely endangered languages
Languages of China